Anatolemys is an extinct turtle genus in the family Macrobaenidae. Two species are known, both of which lived in the Late Cretaceous. Fossils were discovered in the Yalovach Formation of Tajikistan, the Kulbikin Member and Khodzhakul and Bissekty Formations of Uzbekistan and the Bostobe Formation of Kazakhstan. With  in carapace length, Anatolemys maximus was one of the three largest macrobaenids along with Early Cretaceous Yakemys multiporcata and Paleocene Judithemys backmani.

References

Further reading 
 Brinkman, Donald B.; Nessov, L. A.; Peng, Jiang-Hua. Khunnuchelys gen.nov., a new trionychid (Testudines: Trionychidae) from the Late Cretaceous of Inner Mongolia and Uzbekistan. Canadian Journal of Earth Sciences October 1993.
 Vitek, Natasha S.; Danilov, Igor G.. Soft-shelled turtles (Trionychidae) from the Cenomanian of Uzbekistan. Cretaceous Research May 2014.

 

Macrobaenidae
Prehistoric turtle genera
Cretaceous turtles
Cenomanian life
Turonian life
Coniacian life
Santonian life
Late Cretaceous reptiles of Asia
Fossils of Kazakhstan
Fossils of Tajikistan
Fossils of Uzbekistan
Bissekty Formation
Fossil taxa described in 1979